To Be Sixteen is a Canadian drama film, directed by Jean Pierre Lefebvre and released in 1979. The film stars Yves Benoît as Louis, a 16-year-old high school student who is sent to a mental institution by his father (Aubert Pallascio) to punish him for his rebelliousness, and is under the care of a psychiatrist (Gilles Renaud).

The film's cast also includes Marthe Choquette, Michèle Magny, Éric Beauséjour, Frédérique Collin, Pierre Curzi, Lise L'Heureux and Jean Marchand.

The film premiered in the Directors Fortnight stream at the 1979 Cannes Film Festival, and was later screened in the Critics Choice program at the 1979 Festival of Festivals.

References

External links

1979 films
Canadian drama films
Films set in Quebec
Films shot in Quebec
Films directed by Jean Pierre Lefebvre
1979 drama films
1970s French-language films
French-language Canadian films
1970s Canadian films